Cindy Le Coeur is a recording artist, singer, and dancer from the Democratic Republic of the Congo. She is a member of the Congolese band Quartier Latin International, formed and led by musician Koffi Olomide.

See also
 Fally Ipupa
 Bouro Mpela
 Gibson Butukondolo

References

External links
  Wagging tongues ‘kill’ Koffi Olomide

Living people
People from Kinshasa
21st-century Democratic Republic of the Congo women singers
Democratic Republic of the Congo songwriters
Soukous musicians
Quartier Latin International
Year of birth missing (living people)
Place of birth missing (living people)